"Sweetness" is a song by British R&B-soul singer, songwriter, actress and author Michelle Gayle, released on 12 September 1994 as the second single from her eponymous debut album (1994). It is her most successful hit single, reaching number four on the UK Singles Chart and number one on the UK R&B Singles Chart. It also peaked within the top 40 in New Zealand and several countries across Europe, including Denmark, where it entered the top 10 and peaked at number seven.

Critical reception
In his weekly UK chart commentary, James Masterton wrote, "The follow-up has been a long time in coming but has been well worth the wait, belying the soap origins of the singer. Radio loves it to death, hence this high entry and I would be very surprised if this does not scrape a Top 10 placing." He added, "Its the kind of single that grows on you with each play". A reviewer from Music & Media commented, "Like tea-for-one, there's now also new jill swing for individuals. The radio mix is the sweetest, but the West End mix is far more adventurous and memorable." Alan Jones from Music Week wrote, "Penned by Narada Michael Walden and Preston Glass, it's quite odd with some ill-advised spoken segments alongside the better sung parts. It never gets into overdrive, but will still be a hit." Rob Pendry of Swansea Sound called the song "excellent" and commented that "Sweetness" set a "great future" for Gayle, proving she could branch out from her acting career.

Charts

Weekly charts

Year-end charts

Certifications

References

1994 songs
1994 singles
First Avenue Records singles
Michelle Gayle songs
RCA Records singles
Songs written by Narada Michael Walden
Songs written by Preston Glass